John Norton Loughborough (January 26, 1832 – April 7, 1924) was an early Seventh-day Adventist minister.

Biography

Born in Victor, New York, Loughborough began preaching about the Second Coming of Christ at seventeen years of age, renting a church to deliver his lectures. He was involved in the Seventh-day Adventist movement from its early days, having been called to preach by Ellen White in 1852.

He worked for the Adventists in New England, Michigan, Ohio, Great Britain, and California. In 1878 Ellen White told him that his work for the church "must be made to tell for its full value and that he will have to preach the message." He published an account of the message and history of Seventh-day Adventism in 1902 titled The Rise and Progress of the Third Angel's Message, but the book was lost when the Review and Herald burned in Battle Creek, Michigan in 1903.  He then published another book, The Great Second Advent Movement, in 1905. In it Loughborough describes his first-hand experiences in the history of the church, the visions and prophecies of Ellen White, early divisions in the church, and various philosophical and religious matters, as well as some autobiographical material.

F. C. Gilbert (1867-1946) discusses Loughborough's experiences with Ellen White's  visions in his book  Divine Predictions of Mrs. Ellen G. White Fulfilled, especially her predictions involving slavery and the onset of the American Civil War.

The John Loughborough School(1980-2013) in Tottenham, North London, was named after him.

One well known quote by Loughborough appeared in an October 8, 1861 Review and Herald article (now the Adventist Review), in which he was quoted speaking against the formation of creeds:
"The first step of apostasy is to get up a creed, telling us what we shall believe. The second is, to make that creed a test of fellowship. The third is to try members by that creed. The fourth to denounce as heretics those who do not believe that creed. And fifth, to commence persecution against such."

Health reform

Loughborough became a strict vegetarian in 1863. He authored articles on diet and health for The Health Reformer. He compiled the first Adventist medical book, Handbook of Health (1868), which excerpted material from Sylvester Graham, James Caleb Jackson, Russell Thacher Trall and others. 

He was active in Britain until 1883 and was a member of Christian Temperance Missionary Society, Temperance Alliance and Vegetarian Society.

See also 

 Seventh-day Adventist Church
 Seventh-day Adventist Church Pioneers

References

External links
 Online version of "The Great Second Advent Movement" (pdf)
 Rise and Progress of the Seventh-day Adventists (DjVu) from AdventistArchives.org

1832 births
1924 deaths
American Seventh-day Adventists
American Seventh-day Adventist ministers
American temperance activists
American vegetarianism activists
Christian vegetarianism
History of the Seventh-day Adventist Church
Seventh-day Adventists in health science
Seventh-day Adventist missionaries in the United States
Seventh-day Adventist religious workers